Horace Francis John Rickett (3 January 1912 – January 1989), sometimes known as Harry Rickett, was an English professional football goalkeeper who played in the Football League for Reading.

Career statistics

References 

English footballers
English Football League players
Association football goalkeepers
Brentford F.C. wartime guest players
Aldershot F.C. players
Southern Football League players
1912 births
1989 deaths
Chelmsford City F.C. players
Southend United F.C. players
Leyton Orient F.C. players
Fulham F.C. players
Reading F.C. players
West Ham United F.C. wartime guest players

People from Orsett
Millwall F.C. players
Tilbury F.C. players
Tonbridge Angels F.C. players
Watford F.C. wartime guest players